Aaen is a Danish surname. The double a is equivalent to the Danish å. The pronunciation is very similar to the Welsh surname Owen. Notable people with the surname include:

Frank Aaen (born 1951), Danish politician
Gitte Aaen (born 1981), Danish handballer
Jonas Aaen Jørgensen (born 1986), Danish cyclist 

Danish-language surnames